Kheyrabad-e Olya may refer to:

Kheyrabad-e Olya, Kerman
Kheyrabad-e Olya, Kohgiluyeh and Boyer-Ahmad
Kheyrabad-e Olya, Lorestan
Kheyrabad-e Olya, Razavi Khorasan